is a Japanese surname and place name. It may refer to:
 Ei-ichi Negishi, a Japanese chemist who was awarded the 2010 Nobel Prize in Chemistry
 Negishi coupling, a chemical reaction discovered by Ei-ichi Negishi in 1977
 Kichitaro Negishi, a Japanese film director
 , a neighborhood of Taitō, formerly a village
 Negishi, a neighborhood of Isogo-ku, Yokohama, formerly a village
 Negishi Line, a railway line that runs between Yokohama and Ōfuna stations
 Negishi Station (Kanagawa)
 Negishi Station (Fukushima)
 Negishi (My-HiME Destiny), a fictional character in the light novel series My-HiME Destiny
 Takashi Negishi, Japanese economist who extended general equilibrium modeling for competition and welfare
 Negishi welfare weights, a weight function developed by Takashi Negishi in 1972 that freezes income distributions
 Negishi Shingorō, a Japanese martial artist
 Negishi-ryū, Japanese shurikenjutsu school founded by Negishi Shōrei

See also
 Negishi Station (disambiguation)

Japanese-language surnames